Orduniq was a region and a noble family of the old Armenia  300–800, in Ordoru or West Phasiane.

Ancient Armenia